A Study of Negro Artists is a silent film in black and white on four reels that was created in the 1930s to highlight the development of African-American fine arts. The film features many influential black artists associated with the Harlem Renaissance. The 37-minute motion picture was made by Jules V. D. Bucher.

Funding
The project was funded by the Harmon Foundation and screened at the New York Public Library to raise funds to save the Harlem Art Workshop.  In creating A Study of Negro Artists, the Harmon Foundation hoped to educate the American public about the rich African-American arts scene developing in New York City.

Significance

The film is an example of the New Negro Arts movement associated with the Harlem Renaissance. It also exemplifies the tendency to segregate artistic achievement according to perceived racial differences.

Art critic John Ott has suggested that efforts by the Harmon Foundation of this kind "eclipses African American artistic endeavors with images of black menial employment."  According to Ott, the film implies that artistic work is a leisure activity, but synonymous with labor by focusing attention on the working bodies of the featured artists, rather than the products of their work. Inter-titles further this suggestion:
 "Until recognition comes, the artist seeks a living wherever he can."
 "The leisure thus gained leaves him free to work again for fame and recognition,"
 "The Negro artist today must work with his hands to earn a living; his art is but a spare‐time activity."

Featured artists 

 James Latimer Allen
 Charles Alston
 William Ellisworth Artis
 Richmond Barthé
 Aaron Douglas
 Robert S. Duncanson
 Palmer Hayden
 Malvin Gray Johnson
 Sargent Claude Johnson
 Lois Mailou Jones
 Benjamin Spurgeon Kitchin
 Richard William Lindsey
 Susie Maribel McIver
 Pastor Argudin y Pedroso
 James A. Porter
 Augusta Savage
 Georgette Seabrooke
 Arthur Alfonso Schomburg
 Henry Ossawa Tanner
 Hale A. Woodruff

References

External links
A Study of Negro Artists : Internet Archive

American silent short films
Documentary films about African Americans
Black-and-white documentary films
Documentary films about visual artists
African-American art
Harlem Renaissance
Documentary films about New York City
Art in New York City
Articles containing video clips
American black-and-white films